Cimarron is a city in and the county seat of Gray County, Kansas, United States.  As of the 2020 census, the population of the city was 1,981.

History

Cimarron was first settled in 1878. It took its name from a fork in the Chisholm Trail which led travelers to the Cimarron River.

Between 1887 and 1893, a county seat war took place in Gray County that involved several notable Old West figures, such as Bat Masterson, Bill Tilghman, and Ben Daniels. As a result of the dispute, Cimarron became the permanent county seat of Gray County.

In the wee hours of June 10, 1893, Bill Doolin and four members of his gang robbed a train one-half mile east of Cimarron.

In 2016 the Southwest Chief owned by Amtrak derailed, and Amtrak and BNSF filed a lawsuit against one of the companies in Cimarron for damaging the rails by a road vehicle.

Geography
Cimarron is located at  (37.808332, −100.347413).

Climate
According to the Köppen Climate Classification system, Cimarron has a semi-arid climate, abbreviated "BSk" on climate maps.

Demographics

2010 census
As of the census of 2010, there were 2,184 people, 789 households, and 569 families residing in the city. The racial makeup of the city was 92.2% White, 0.1% African American, 0.5% Native American, 0.4% Asian, 5.4% from other races, and 1.3% from two or more races. Hispanic or Latino of any race were 19.1% of the population.

There were 789 households, of which 41.7% had children under the age of 18 living with them, 58.2% were married couples living together, 10.8% had a female householder with no husband present, 3.2% had a male householder with no wife present, and 27.9% were non-families. 24.3% of all households were made up of individuals, and 9.9% had someone living alone who was 65 years of age or older. The average household size was 2.73 and the average family size was 3.27.

The median age in the city was 33.6 years. 32.3% of residents were under the age of 18; 6.1% were between the ages of 18 and 24; 26% were from 25 to 44; 24% were from 45 to 64; and 11.5% were 65 years of age or older. The gender makeup of the city was 48.8% male and 51.2% female.

2000 census
As of the census of 2000, there were 1,934 people, 720 households, and 526 families residing in the city. The racial makeup of the city was 92.50% White, 0.41% African American, 0.62% Native American, 0.16% Asian, 0.10% Pacific Islander, 4.86% from other races, and 1.34% from two or more races. Hispanic or Latino of any race were 9.82% of the population.

There were 720 households, out of which 39.6% had children under the age of 18 living with them, 60.7% were married couples living together, 8.9% had a female householder with no husband present, and 26.9% were non-families. 24.3% of all households were made up of individuals, and 11.1% had someone living alone who was 65 years of age or older. The average household size was 2.65 and the average family size was 3.17.

In the city, the population was spread out, with 30.6% under the age of 18, 8.3% from 18 to 24, 28.0% from 25 to 44, 21.7% from 45 to 64, and 11.4% who were 65 years of age or older. The median age was 34 years. For every 100 females, there were 96.5 males. For every 100 females age 18 and over, there were 94.8 males.

The median income for a household in the city was $41,379, and the median income for a family was $48,636. Males had a median income of $31,402 versus $21,406 for females. The per capita income for the city was $17,970. About 4.6% of families and 6.9% of the population were below the poverty line, including 8.1% of those under age 18 and 9.5% of those age 65 or over.

Education
The community is served by Cimarron–Ensign USD 102 public school district.

Transportation
 Cimarron Municipal Airport

Notable people
 Ian Campbell, former defensive end for Kansas State University
 Nicholas Klaine, journalist (editor of the Dodge City Times and New West Echo), built the Cimarron Hotel

See also
 Battle of Cimarron
 Cimarron Hotel
 Old Gray County Courthouse
 Santa Fe Trail

References

Further reading

External links

 City of Cimarron
 Cimarron – Directory of Public Officials
 USD 102, local school district
 Cimarron City Map, KDOT

Cities in Kansas
County seats in Kansas
Cities in Gray County, Kansas
Kansas populated places on the Arkansas River
1878 establishments in Kansas
Populated places established in 1878